State Highway 153 (SH 153) is a highway in the U.S. State of Texas that runs from Coleman northwest to a junction south of Sweetwater.

History
SH 153 was originally designated on March 19, 1930 along a route from Valley Mills to Temple as a renumbering of SH 36A. This route was rerouted so that its south end was at Belton later. This route was cancelled on June 15, 1935. The road was restored on October 22, 1935, but as a lateral road, which the section south of McGregor became SH 317 on May 23, 1939, and the remainder became FM 56 on May 19, 1942 (this section became part of SH 317 in 1947).
The current route was designated on May 16, 1988, replacing FM 53.

The section of SH 153 between Winters and SH 70 has seen an increase in traffic due to Google Maps recommending drivers traveling from the South Plains (Lubbock) or Panhandle (Amarillo) regions to cities such as Austin or San Antonio use the highway. Additionally, the highway is only two lanes, features many s-curves, is narrow in many places with no shoulders, and many sections have no passing zones. A fatal head-on collision occurred on the highway between Winters and Wingate on June 14, 2021 that left three people dead. Due to the increase of both traffic and wrecks on SH 153, the Texas Department of Transportation (TxDOT) announced that the speed limit would be reduced from 75 MPH to 65 in Taylor and Nolan counties on June 19, 2021.

Major intersections

References

153
Transportation in Coleman County, Texas
Transportation in Runnels County, Texas
Transportation in Taylor County, Texas
Transportation in Nolan County, Texas